One Week of Days are a husband and wife duo from Kilkenny, Ireland.

History
Bob and Jan had worked together in other groups including Kaydee. In 2000, the couple married and began recording their album "Who You Really Are" under the name One Week of Days.

One Week of Days have announced that they are currently recording their second album and a pre-release single is due out during 2009.

Members 
 Jan Murphy ( Vocals )
 Bob Murphy ( Vocals & Multi-instrumentalist)

Discography

Album

References

Entertainment.ie album review
"7 Days a Week", 2002 interview with Tony Cummings of Cross Rhythms. Retrieved on 6 December 2009.

External links
http://oneweekofdays.bandcamp.com/

Musical groups from County Kilkenny
Christian rock groups
Musical groups established in 2000